Candidus may refer to:

People 

 Tiberius Claudius Candidus, Roman general who fought against Emperor Pescennius Niger in 193
 Saint Candidus (died c.287), Egyptian commander of the Theban Legion
 Cyrion and Candidus (died 320), ethnic Armenian saints
 Candidus Isaurus, historian of the 5th century whose work is in the Patrologia Graeca
 Saint Candidus of Foligno, bishop of the Roman Catholic Diocese of Foligno, 590–602
 Candidus of Fulda, ninth-century Benedictine scholar of the Carolingian Renaissance
 Candidus (floruit 793–802), Anglo-Saxon named Wizo, scholar for Alcuin of York in Gaul
 Candidus, a disciple of Clement of Ireland (c.750–818), teacher and saint
 Hugh of Remiremont, called Candidus (c. 1020–c. 1099), French Benedictine cardinal 
 Hugh Candidus (c. 1095–c. 1160), Benedictine historian of Peterborough Abbey, England
 Pantaleon Candidus (1540–1608), Austrian theologian and author
 Daniel Candidus (1568–1637), German Lutheran theologian and writer
 Candidus, a pen name of American statesman Samuel Adams (1722–1803)
 William Candidus (1840–1910), American opera singer

Other 
 Candidus (Celtic spirit), a "candid spirit" in Lusitanian and Celtic polytheism (Gaul).
 Candidus (cognomen), a third name of a citizen of ancient Rome
 Candidus, charismatic character heard on BBC's Radio Londra in Italy during World War II
 Saint Candidus (Ayne Bru), a painting by Ayne Bru, created 1502–1507

See also
 Alfred I, Prince of Windisch-Grätz (Alfred Candidus Ferdinand)
 Candida (disambiguation)
 Candidiasis, a fungal infection
 George Candidius, (1597–1647), Dutch missionary to Dutch Formosa